Nicholas Turturro Jr. (born January 29, 1962) is an American actor, known for his roles in New York City based films and on the television series Blue Bloods and NYPD Blue. He has collaborated with director Spike Lee since the late 1980s, starting with voice work for Do the Right Thing, and playing a supporting role in BlacKkKlansman. Nicholas is the younger brother of John Turturro and the cousin of Aida Turturro.

Early life
Turturro was born in Brooklyn, New York. His mother, Katherine Florence (Incerella), was an amateur jazz singer, who worked in a Navy yard during World War II, and was born in the U.S., to Italian parents, with roots in Sicily. His father, Nicholas Turturro Sr., was a carpenter and shoemaker who emigrated from Giovinazzo, Apulia, Italy, at the age of six and later fought as a US Navy serviceman on D-Day. In 1983, Turturro, then a struggling actor, was employed as a doorman for the Manhattan apartment building where Billy Joel resided at the time. Turturro would rank all the women Joel brought home by holding up his fingers; Joel's soon-to-be wife, Christie Brinkley, was the only one to get ten fingers twice.

Career
He received an Emmy Award nomination for playing James Martinez on the television series NYPD Blue and was on the series for its first seven seasons. He was a guest ring announcer at Wrestlemania XI for the main event of Shawn Michaels vs. Diesel. His list of credits include portraying Al Capone on The Young Indiana Jones Chronicles and playing the role of Brucie in The Longest Yard and Renaldo in I Now Pronounce You Chuck and Larry. In July 2009, Turturro began co-starring in the comedy web series Dusty Peacock on Crackle.  He played Sgt. Anthony Renzulli on Blue Bloods from 2010 to 2016.

Turturro is an avid New York Yankees fan and is known for his passionate videos on social media supporting the team.

Filmography

Film

Television

References

External links
 

1962 births
Living people
Male actors from New York City
American male film actors
American people of Italian descent
People of Sicilian descent
American male television actors
American male voice actors
20th-century American male actors
21st-century American male actors
People from Brooklyn
People of Apulian descent
Participants in American reality television series